Frank John Yankovic (July 28, 1915 – October 14, 1998) was an American accordion player and polka musician. Known as "America's Polka King", Yankovic was considered the premier artist to play in the Slovenian style during his long career. He was not related to fellow accordionist and song parodist "Weird Al" Yankovic, although the two collaborated.

Background
Yankovic was born to Slovene immigrant parents: Andrew Yankovic (Andreas Jankovič, 1879–1949) from Kal and Rose T. Yankovic (née Theresia Mele, 1886–1968) from Cerknica, who married in 1910. Yankovic was raised in the Collinwood neighborhood on Cleveland's East Side. He released over 200 recordings in his career. In 1986, he was awarded the first-ever Grammy in the Best Polka Recording category. He rarely strayed from Slovenian-style polka, but did record with country guitarist Chet Atkins and pop singer Don Everly. He also recorded a version of the "Too Fat Polka" with comedian Drew Carey.

History
Yankovic's father, a blacksmith, and his mother, a cook, met in a lumber camp in West Virginia where they both worked. When Yankovic was young, his father moved to Cleveland to escape authorities who learned of his bootlegging, and the rest of the family followed shortly thereafter. While living in Cleveland, he became enthralled by the brass bands that played at Slovenian social functions. His mother took on boarders to help with the family finances, including a man named Max Zelodec who performed Slovenian tunes on a button box. Yankovic acquired an accordion at age 9, and received a few lessons from Zelodec. By the late 1920s, in his early teenage years, he was a working musician, playing for community events. In the 1930s, he formed a business relationship with Joe Trolli and began making radio appearances on stations such as WJAY and WGAR. As his reputation spread, he sought opportunities to make records, but the major labels turned him down. His first records were made for the Yankee and Joliet labels operated by Fred Wolf, and the expenses were paid for by Yankovic himself.

In 1940, he married his first wife June, and they began to raise a family. However, the expenses of family life quickly overcame the incoming money from his music career, so he opened a tavern, calling it the Yankovic Bar. It became a popular hangout for local musicians, and he continued to run it until he sold it in 1948, dedicating himself to the accordion.

Yankovic enlisted in the armed forces in 1943 and cut numerous records while on leave, prior to his departure for Europe. Yankovic was assigned duty in 1943 in the infantry as a flame-thrower operator. He fought in the Battle of the Bulge where a severe case of frostbite nearly required the amputation of his hands and feet. Fortunately, he was able to beat the resulting gangrene before that became necessary, and was awarded a Purple Heart. The doctors urged him to have his fingers amputated, but he refused, as that would have ended his music career. After getting out of the hospital, he and four other musicians were assigned to special services to entertain the troops, including General George Patton and his Third United States Army.

Yankovic hit the national scene when he earned two platinum singles for "Just Because" (1947) and "Blue Skirt Waltz" (1949). Others who recorded the Blue Skirt Waltz were the Tunemixers and Guy Lombardo both in 1949, Lawrence Welk (Myron Floren) in 1958, Jim Ed Brown and the Browns in 1960, Hank Thompson in 1962, and Bobby Vinton in 1976. Yankovic found a Bohemian Waltz called "Cervenou Sukynku," (written by Vaclav Blaha) or loosely translated, "Red Skirt Waltz." Yankovic asked Mitchell Parrish ("Stardust", "Sleighride") to write new lyrics to the melody. Parrish changed "red" to "blue". Yankovic sold over 2.5 million records and with the Tunemixers version and Guy Lombardo's version, it sold over 4 million records total in 1949. It was the second Cleveland-style song to sell over one million recordings.
 
Columbia Records initially refused to record "Just Because", because other versions of the song had been around for years without much success; only allowing it when Yankovic said that he would buy the first 10,000 records. Yankovic obtained the title of America's Polka King after beating Louis Bashell, Romy Gosz, Harold Loeffelmacher and the Six Fat Dutchmen, Whoopee John Wilfahrt, and Lawrence Duchow in a battle of the bands in Milwaukee at the Milwaukee Arena on June 9, 1948.

In 1970, a house fire destroyed the gold records for "Just Because" and "Blue Skirt Waltz".

Yankovic also hosted the television series Polka Time for Buffalo, New York-based WKBW-TV for 26 weeks in 1962. He commuted from Cleveland to host each episode, which aired live. He also hosted a similar show at WGN-TV Chicago at about the same time.

He won a Grammy Award in 1986 for his album 70 Years of Hits. He was the first winner in the Polka category. The NARAS (Grammy) organization dropped the category in 2008.

He performed with musical comedian and fellow accordionist "Weird Al" Yankovic, although the two are not related. Al, who also performs polka music among many other styles, has jokingly hypothesized that he was given accordion lessons as a child because his parents thought that "there should be at least one more accordion-playing Yankovic in the world." Al performed accordion on "Who Stole the Kishka?" on one of Frankie's final records, Songs of the Polka King, Vol. 1. A portion of Frankie's "The Tick Tock Polka" is included in the song "Polka Face" on Weird Al's Alpocalypse; it was used as a lead-in for Weird Al's take on "Tik Tok" by Ke$ha.

Death
Yankovic died on October 14, 1998, in New Port Richey, Florida, from heart failure, at the age of 83. He is buried in Cleveland's Calvary Cemetery. Hundreds of friends, family, his loyal fans and fellow musicians attended his memorial service. At his peak, Yankovic traveled extensively and performed 325 shows a year. He sold 30 million records during his lifetime.

Hometown square named in his honor

In Bob Dolgan's 2006 biography of Yankovic, Frankie's longtime drummer Dave Wolnik observed that "Yankovic didn't have a street named for him in his own hometown". This launched a campaign by the National Cleveland-Style Polka Hall of Fame and Museum and City Councilman Michael Polensek, and in a ceremony on August 21, 2007, the square at the intersection of Waterloo Rd. and East 152nd St. in Cleveland, not far from where Yankovic grew up, was named in his honor.

Former band members
 Denny Boneck (Milwaukee, WI), stand-up bass and back-up vocals. Played, toured and recorded with Frank as one of the "Yanks" from 1970 to 1981. 
 Joseph A. Godec (upright 3/4 bass) and Frank Godec (guitar) toured Ely and range 1940-44 and 1951.  
 Johnny Pecon - Button Box and Piano Accordion with the original "Frankie Yankovic and His Yanks" from 1946 through 1949.  Johnny was considered the best polka accordion player of his time.
 Henry "Hank The Yank" Bokal - Drummer with the original "Frankie Yankovic and His Yanks" from 1941 through 1949.
 Anthony "Tops" Cardone was a member of the popular Yankovic Show band that toured in the early 1950s, playing in Hollywood, Las Vegas, and top nightclubs in the United States. Tops played second accordion with Frank's band. 
 Georgie Cook - Banjo player, who helped Yankovic establish the "Cleveland Sound".
 Joey Miskulin - Began playing with Yankovic in 1962 at the age of 13. This was the start of a relationship that lasted for the next 35 years. Joey developed his skill with the accordion and music while touring with the band. Joey began writing and arranging songs for Yankovic, eventually arranging and producing some of Yankovic's albums, including the Grammy Award-winning album "70 Years of Hits".
 Jeff Winard - Accomplished accordionist from Milwaukee; traveled with Yankovic in later years.
 Rod Verette - played bass on Yankovic's west coast tour in late '80's.
 Marian "Lefty" Bell - played bass with Yankovic.  His father was a tenor in the Slovenian operettas in Cleveland.
 Steve Kucenski - played 2nd accordion in the late 70s to early 90s.
 Adolph "Church" Srnick - long time bass player with Yankovic. Played the stand up 3/4 bass and also the "baby" electric bass from 1945 until he died in 1968
Eddie "Teener" - played banjo with Yankovic off and on from 1953 until his death in 1970.  Toured and was featured weekly on his TV show. Co-wrote with Yankovic on "Happy Polka", which was originally written as a commercial for the TV show.

See also

Slovene Americans

References

Further reading
 Dolgan, Bob (2006). America's Polka King: The Real Story of Frankie Yankovic. Cleveland, OH: Gray & Company, Publishers.

External links
Sample text from the book America's Polka King by Bob Dolgan
Newspaper Article
Biography on ElvisPelvis.com
Library of Congress essay on Yankovic.
Lifetime Achievement Honoree, sample music
Dennis Kucinich's letter to Clinton in support of awarding Yankovic a National Medal of Arts
Profile of Frank Yankovic at The Remington Site
New York Times article on Yankovic's death
Good 'Early Years' bio at CD Baby

1915 births
1998 deaths
People from Euclid, Ohio
People from Tucker County, West Virginia
American accordionists
United States Army personnel of World War II
American people of Slovenian descent
Burials in Calvary Cemetery (Cleveland)
Grammy Award winners
Musicians from Ohio
Polka musicians
Slovene-American culture in Cleveland
20th-century American musicians
20th-century accordionists
United States Army soldiers